Clarence Kelly  (born 1941) is an American sedevacantist traditionalist Catholic bishop. He is a co-founder of the Society of Saint Pius V and the founder of the Congregation of Saint Pius V.

Biography 

Clarence Kelly was born in 1941, in Brooklyn, New York, U.S. He joined the Air Force in 1959.
Clarence Kelly joined a Seminary in Pennsylvania in 1964 and completed his novitiate year in 1966–1967.

He attended the Catholic University of America between 1967 and 1969 where he studied philosophy. He began his theology studies in 1969 at Immaculate Conception Seminary in Huntington, New York.

In 1971, Clarence Kelly joined the SSPX Seminary at Econe.

Priesthood

Society of Saint Pius X (SSPX)
On 14 April 1973, in Écône, Switzerland, Kelly was ordained a priest by Archbishop Marcel Lefebvre for the Society of Saint Pius X (SSPX).

After his ordination, he returned to the United States and undertook some speaking engagements for the John Birch Society.

He eventually became the superior of the SSPX's North-East district of the United States.

Society of Saint Pius V (SSPV)
Lefebvre directed the SSPX's American priests to follow the 1962 liturgical books. Kelly and eight other American priests refused to do this. On 27 April 1983, these nine priests, along with some seminarians who were sympathetic to them, were expelled from the SSPX by Lefebvre for their refusal to use the 1962 Missal and for other reasons, such as their resistance to Lefebvre's order that priests of the SSPX must accept the decrees of nullity handed down by diocesan marriage tribunals, and their disapproval of the SSPX's policy of accepting into the society new members who had been ordained to the priesthood according to the revised sacramental rites of Paul VI.

Almost immediately, these priests, with Kelly as their leader, formed the Society of Saint Pius V (SSPV), which held that it is at least a debatable question whether the popes since 1958 have in fact been legitimate Roman Pontiffs. The Society does not believe that it has the right to decide the question of sedevacantism definitively, but believes that "those who presently are thought to be occupying hierarchical positions in the Catholic Church are acting, for the most part, as though they do not have the Faith, according to all human means of judging". They reject any changes to the Mass (including changes made to the Holy Week Ceremonies by Pope Pius XII in 1951), and adhere to the preconciliar Code of Canon Law. Kelly was replaced by Father Richard Williamson as the superior of the SSPX's North-East district of the United States.

In part due to Kelly's rejection of the validity of sedevacantist bishops consecrated by or in the lineage of Bishop Ngô Đình Thục, some of the original priests of the SSPV, such as Father Daniel Dolan, Father Anthony Cekada, Father Donald Sanborn, and Father Thomas Zapp, broke away from the society.

In 1984, Kelly purchased a former Catskills resort in Round Top, New York, and established  St. Joseph's Novitiate. There he also founded the Daughters of Mary, Mother of Our Savior, a congregation of religious sisters.

Lengthy litigation followed the expulsion of Kelly and others from the SSPX over the disposition of property and churches. In 1985, Kelly, Cekada, Dolan, and Sanborn sued Schmidberger, Williamson, Bolduc, and others related to the SSPX for libel.

Episcopacy
On 19 October 1993, in Carlsbad, California, United States, Kelly was consecrated a bishop by Bishop Alfredo Méndez-Gonzalez, the retired Bishop of Arecibo, Puerto Rico, Puerto Rico.

In 1996, Kelly founded the Congregation of Saint Pius V (not to be confused with the Society of Saint Pius V, which he co-founded earlier), a Society of Common Life for priests and coadjutor brothers.

On 28 February 2007, he consecrated Father Joseph Santay, CSPV, as a bishop.

On 27 December 2018, Kelly served as the co-consecrator in Santay's episcopal consecration of Father James Carroll, CSPV.

Kelly resides at Immaculate Heart Seminary.

Books 
 Conspiracy against God and Man
 The Sacred and the Profane

References

External links

1941 births
American traditionalist Catholics
Living people
People expelled from the Society of St. Pius X
Sedevacantists
Traditionalist Catholic bishops
Writers from Brooklyn
Date of birth missing (living people)